Park Se-wan (born September 24, 1994) is a South Korean actress.

Career 
In 2016, Park made her television acting debut in KBS2's short drama special The Red Teacher. She started gaining more attention in 2017 with her supporting roles in the coming-of-age series School 2017 and the romantic comedy drama I'm Not a Robot.

In December 2018, Park starred in the youth drama Just Dance, based on the documentary of the same name, alongside Jang Dong-yoon with whom she appeared in School 2017. It was her first lead role.

In 2019, she was cast in the fantasy drama Joseon Survival Period and in the drama Never Twice.

Filmography

Film

Television series

Web series

Awards and nominations

References

External links 
 
 
 

1994 births
Living people
People from Busan
South Korean television actresses
South Korean film actresses
South Korean stage actresses
21st-century South Korean actresses
Sungkyunkwan University alumni